

Biography
Nikolai Vasilievich Kuzmin is a Russian painter born in 1938 in Talynskoye, Vachsky District, not far from the town of Nizhny Novgorod.
After studying in the Art College of Pavlovo-na-Oke, close to his home village Talynskoye, he entered the Stroganov Moscow State University of Arts and Industry and became an alumni in 1970. In 1991 he entered the Artists' Union of the USSR, which became in 1992 the Union of Russian Artists.

The painter has travelled and painted widely in Western Europe  and organised some exhibitions there, notably in France. The artist's paintings are available in the Matthieu Dubuc gallery in Rueil-Malmaison, in the vicinity of Paris-La Défense. The artist's exhibitions take place in galleries, museums  and annual exhibitions organised in common by artists, such as Art Capital or Souvenir de Corot in Paris and its neighbourhood. The artist has been participating for many years in the Watercolour and Drawing Annual Exhibition in Grand Palais, Paris, France. In 2022 also at Art Capital, Nikolai Kuzmin took part at Grand Palais Éphémère in the 'Salon des Comparaisons' annual exhibition, together with the 'Ut pictura poesis' group of artists, of which he is a member, led by the painter Carole Melmoux.

Nikolai Kuzmin also has regular exhibitions in Russia, notably with the Moscow Union of artists, of which he is a member.

Artwork
Nikolai Kuzmin's favourite painting technique is oil on canvas with spatula.

Nikolai Kuzmin's painting is not far from expressionism and fauvism.

The painter's work has been strongly influenced by the remembrance of his childhood.

Nikolai Kuzmin likes painting the architecture of his home town Moscow. He also paints the landscapes he observes during his travels, like on the island of Korčula in Croatia.

The themes covered by Nikolai Kuzmin's paintings are varied:
 Garden-spring-blooming
 Artwork on paper / On the road to Murom-the Farewell
 Abstract oil artwork / Interlacing of roads
 Portrait
 After the war
 Travel:
○ Paris Region:
- Ponds of Corot
- Forest of Fausses Repose
- Versailles-Viroflay
- Around Paris
- Paris
○ French Province:
- Mediterranean
- Corsica
- Sainte-Victoire-Mountain
- The Alps
- Brittany
- Normandy
- Other French regions
○ Croatia 
○ Crimea
 Native soil
 At the dacha
 Architecture:
○ Moscow
○ Russia
○ Western Europe (Denmark, United Kingdom, Germany, Belgium)
 Landscape:
○ Russian landscape
○ Russian winter landscape
○ Western Europe (Denmark, United Kingdom, Germany, Belgium)
 Religious, popular and mythological:
○ Religious
○ Popular
○ Mythological
 Still life and Flowers:
○ Still life
○ Flowers
 Other themes

References

External links 

Site personnel en russe

Russian painters
Russian male painters
20th-century Russian painters
21st-century Russian painters
Russian landscape painters
Russian portrait painters
Russian Expressionist painters
Russian Impressionist painters
Russian realist painters
Russian romantic painters
Russian still life painters
Fauvism
1938 births
Living people
20th-century Russian male artists
21st-century Russian male artists
Stroganov Moscow State Academy of Arts and Industry alumni